Jenifer Ellen Lovell (-Moreno), more known as Jenifer Lovell, (born February 1, 1974, Miami, Florida) is a retired American rhythmic gymnast.

She competed for the United States of America in the individual rhythmic gymnastics all-around competition at the 1992 Olympic Games in Barcelona. She was 23rd in the qualification round and didn't advance to the final.

References

External links 
 Jenifer Lovell at Sports-Reference.com

1974 births
Living people
Sportspeople from Miami
American rhythmic gymnasts
Gymnasts at the 1992 Summer Olympics
Olympic gymnasts of the United States
Pan American Games medalists in gymnastics
Pan American Games bronze medalists for the United States
Gymnasts at the 1991 Pan American Games
21st-century American women
20th-century American women